Robert Hranj (5 September 1962, Varaždin) is the Chief of the General Staff of the Republic of Croatia. He was appointed to that position in February 2020 after Zoran Milanović became the new President of Croatia.

References

1962 births
Living people
Croatian admirals